Justice Mitchell may refer to:

Burley Mitchell, associate justice and chief justice of the North Carolina Supreme Court
Joseph Mitchell (Indiana judge), associate justice of the Supreme Court of Indiana
John R. Mitchell (judge), associate justice of the Washington Supreme Court
Henry L. Mitchell, associate justice of the Florida Supreme Court
James T. Mitchell, associate justice of the Supreme Court of Pennsylvania
Richard F. Mitchell, associate justice of the Iowa Supreme Court
Stephen Mix Mitchell, associate justice of the Connecticut Supreme Court
Walter J. Mitchell, associate justice of the Maryland Court of Appeals
William B. Mitchell, associate justice of the Minnesota Supreme Court